Ammonite is the extinct Canaanite language of the Ammonite people mentioned in the Bible, who used to live in modern-day Jordan, and after whom its capital Amman is named. Only fragments of their language survive—chiefly the 9th century BC Amman Citadel Inscription, the 7th–6th century BC Tel Siran bronze bottle, and a few ostraca. As far as can be determined from the small corpus, it was extremely similar to Biblical Hebrew, with some possible Aramaic influence including the use of the verb ‘bd (עבד) instead of the more common Biblical Hebrew ‘śh (עשה) for 'make'. The only other notable difference with Biblical Hebrew is the sporadic retention of feminine singular -t (’šħt 'cistern', but ‘lyh 'high [fem.]'.) Ammonite also appears to have possessed largely typical correspondences of diphthongs, with words such as ywmt (יומת *yawmōt, 'days')  both preserving /aw/ and showing a shift to /o/, and other words such as yn (ין 'wine') exhibiting a shift of /ay/ to ē (yēn <  *yayn) much like Hebrew.

It was first described as a separate language in 1970 by Italian Orientalist Giovanni Garbini. Subsequently, a number of inscriptions previously identified as Hebrew, Phoenician, or Aramaic were reclassified, as a result of consensus around the similarity of the Amman Theatre Inscription, Amman Citadel Inscription, Tell Siren Bottle, Heshbon Ostraca, and Tell el-Mazer Ostraca.

References

Bibliography
 
 
 

Canaanite languages
Hebrew language
Extinct languages of Asia
Languages attested from the 9th century BC
Languages extinct in the 5th century BC
5th-century BC disestablishments
Spurious languages